"" ("The Taiga Filled With Pine Nuts") is a Tuvan folk song. It was first adopted in 1944 as the national anthem of the Tuvan People's Republic (TPR) when Tuva was an independent socialist republic recognised only by the Soviet Union and the Mongolian People's Republic. Later in the same year following the Soviet annexation of Tuva, the country was then incorporated into the USSR and thus became the Tuvan Autonomous Oblast (TAO). In 1961, the political status of the region was upgraded to the Tuvan Autonomous Soviet Socialist Republic, yet the anthem still remained.

Even after the dissolution of the Soviet Union, "Tooruktug dolgai tañdym" remained in use for the Republic of Tuva (a federal subject of Russia), until 11 August 2011 when it was replaced by the current regional anthem titled "Men – Tyva Men".

The song expresses the Tuvan belief that one who takes care of their environment, livestock and taiga will be fulfilled. It refers to the Tannu-Ola mountains, mentioned in the lyrics as "Tañdy", a mountain range in southern Tuva that is revered by the Tuvan people. The name of the mountain range is incorporated into "Tannu-Tuva", the popular name for the Tuvan People's Republic.

Lyrics

Notes

References

External links
Lyrics
 Tooruktug taiga lyrics
Audio recorded by the Tuvan National Orchestra. The orchestral arrangement was composed by Ayana Samiyaevna Mongush.
Tooruktug Dolgay Tangdym melody in ASF format.

Historical national anthems
Anthems of Tuva
Russian anthems
Year of song unknown
Songwriter unknown
National anthem compositions in D major